The 1914–15 Istanbul Football League season was the 10th season of the league. Because of the high number of teams participating in the league and eventual disagreements among the clubs, there were two separate groups in that year. As a result, there were two Istanbul champions at the end of the season. Galatasaray won the Istanbul Football Union League, while Fenerbahçe became champions in the Istanbul Championship League (Turkish: İstanbul Şampiyonluğu Ligi). According to most sources, including RSSSF, there was a final match between Fenerbahçe and Galatasaray on 11 February 1916, which Fenerbahçe won 3–1, and thus became the sole champions of the 1914–15 season.

Season

Istanbul Football Union League

Istanbul Championship League

Playoff
A playoff match was played to determine the winning team in the Istanbul Football Union League. Galatasaray won the match.

References

 Tuncay, Bülent (2002). Galatasaray Tarihi. Yapı Kredi Yayınları 
 Yüce, Mehmet  (February 2009). On gümüş yürek. Galatasaray Magazine Issue 76, Pages 74–85
 Futbol vol.2, Galatasaray. Tercüman Spor Ansiklopedisi. (1981)

Istanbul Football League seasons
Istanbul
Istanbul